Håkon Edvard Andersen (14 April 1925 – 9 December 2012) was a Norwegian bishop.

He was born in Stavanger and took the cand.theol. degree in 1949 at the MF Norwegian School of Theology. He was the secretary-general of the Norwegian Lutheran Inner Mission Society from 1966 to 1975, then dean in Jæren. After three years there, he served as bishop of the Diocese of Tunsberg from 1978 to 1990. He chaired Organisasjonenes Fellesråd and Luther Forlag.

References

1925 births
2012 deaths
People from Stavanger
MF Norwegian School of Theology, Religion and Society alumni
Bishops of Tunsberg
20th-century Lutheran bishops